Two-stage presidential elections were held in Finland in 1968. On 15 and 16 January the public elected presidential electors to an electoral college. They in turn elected the President. The result was a victory for Urho Kekkonen, who won on the first ballot. The turnout for the popular vote was 70.2.

Kekkonen's two opponents, the centre-right National Coalition Party's candidate Director of the National Commercial Bank Matti Virkkunen and the populist Finnish Rural Party's leader Veikko Vennamo, criticized him for governing Finland in a too autocratic way.

Vennamo in particular accused Kekkonen of pursuing a too dependent and servile foreign policy towards the Soviet Union.  Since almost thirty per cent of the eligible Finnish voters abstained from voting, there was some underlying discontent with the presidential candidates, or Kekkonen's wide lead over his two opponents.  Notably, the National Coalitioners and Ruralists - both opposition parties at the time - gained clearly higher percentages of the popular vote than in the 1966 Finnish parliamentary elections.  This foreshadowed their major gains in the 1970 Finnish parliamentary elections. Although during this presidential campaign, Kekkonen promised not to run for president again (see, for example, Timo Vihavainen, "The Welfare Finland" (Hyvinvointi-Suomi), pp. 859–861 in Seppo Zetterberg et al., eds., A Small Giant of the Finnish History / Suomen historian pikkujättiläinen.  Helsinki:  WSOY, 2003;  Pentti Virrankoski, A History of Finland / Suomen historia, volumes 1&2.  Helsinki:  Finnish Literature Society (Suomalaisen Kirjallisuuden Seura), 2009, p. 961;  Martti Häikiö, The Election of President / Presidentin valinta, p. 96.  Porvoo:  WSOY, 1993;  What-Where-When:  A Citizen's Yearbook (Mitä-Missä-Milloin - Kansalaisen vuosikirja) 1969, p. 140.  Helsinki:  Otava Ltd., 1968), however, he extended his presidential term in 1973 and ran nearly unopposed in 1978.

Results

Popular vote

Electoral college

References

1968
Finland
January 1968 events in Europe